Athyma opalina, the Himalayan sergeant, is a species of nymphalid butterfly found in tropical and subtropical Asia.

References

Cited references

Gallery

opalina
Butterflies of Asia
Lepidoptera of Nepal
Fauna of the Himalayas
Fauna of Tibet
Butterflies described in 1844